William Leslie Cazneau (1807-1876) was a Texas pioneer and is credited with having buried the Alamo Heroes with full military honors.

William Leslie Cazneau was born on October 5, 1807, at Boston, Massachusetts.  In 1839 he moved to Texas and established a general merchandise business.  Appointed on the staff of Thomas J. Chambers in 1835, he served until the Texas Army disbanded.  He was dispatched to the United States to raise men and supplies and was assigned the burial of the remains of the Alamo heroes, as well as the guarding of Mexican prisoners on Galveston island.  He moved to Austin in 1839 and was appointed Commissary General by Mirabeau B. Lamar.  An influential figure in Texas politics, Cazneau represented Travis County in the Seventh, Eighth and Ninth Congresses, in the Convention of 1845, and in the First Legislature.  He served during the Mexican War until August, 1847, when he entered into partnership with Henry L. Kinney.  In 1850, after his marriage to Jane McManus, he established the townsite of Eagle Pass with the object of extending his trading enterprises into Mexico.
 
Under the patronage of James Buchanan, Cazneau was twice appointed special agent to the Dominican Republic, 1853 and 1859.  In 1856 he contracted to furnish one thousand colonists to William Walker in Nicaragua.  In 1861 he entered into partnership with Joseph W. Fabens to colonize former slaves on Santo Domingo, and later was involved in other equally unsuccessful endeavors.  Except for brief intervals, he continued to make his home in the West Indies until his death at his Jamaica estate on January 7, 1876.  José Gabriel García termed him a "tenacious adventurer."

Cazneau's wife, Jane Cazneau, was lost at sea while traveling to Jamaica to recover his body.

References
 

1807 births
1876 deaths
People from Texas